The 2019–20 UCI Track Cycling World Cup (also known as the Tissot UCI Track Cycling World Cup for sponsorship reasons) is a multi-race tournament over a track cycling season. It is the 28th series of the UCI Track Cycling World Cup organised by the UCI. This was the last season of the competition as World Cup because from 2021, the competition will be renamed to UCI Track Cycling Nations Cup.

Series 
Six rounds are scheduled:
 November 1–3, 2019 in Minsk, Belarus.
 November 8–10, 2019 in Glasgow, United Kingdom.
 November 29 – December 1, 2019 in Hong Kong, China.
 December 6–8, 2019 in Cambridge, New Zealand.
 December 13–15, 2019 in Brisbane, Australia.
 January 24–26, 2020 in Milton, Canada.

Format
The following events will be raced at all rounds:
 Individual sprint, men and women
 Team sprint, men and women
 Keirin, men and women
 Team pursuit, men and women
 Madison, men and women
 Omnium, men and women

Standings

Men 

Sprint

Team Sprint

Team Pursuit

Keirin

Omnium

Madison

Women 

Sprint

Team Sprint

Team Pursuit

Keirin

Omnium

Madison

Overall Team Standings 
Overall team standings are calculated based on total number of points gained by the team's riders in each event.

Results

Men

Women

Medal table

References 

UCI Track Cycling World Cup
World Cup
World Cup
UCI Track Cycling World Cup
UCI Track Cycling World Cup
UCI Track Cycling World Cup
UCI Track Cycling World Cup
UCI Track Cycling World Cup
UCI Track Cycling World Cup
UCI Track Cycling World Cup, 2019